Cropton is a village and civil parish in the Ryedale district of North Yorkshire, England.

History
The village is mentioned in the Domesday Book as having three ploughlands, but it does not list any inhabitants. The name of the village derives from Old English (cropp tūn), which means a swelling, mound or hill with a farmstead, settlement or village.  At the 2001 census, the parish (including Aislaby) had a population of 354, decreasing to 321 (including Stape) at the 2011 Census.

The Great Yorkshire Brewery, a microbrewery, is located to the rear of the New Inn on the edge of the village. The owners of the pub started brewing their own beer in 1984, though beer had been brewed in the village as far back as 1613. To the rear of the brewery is the site of a Motte-and-bailey castle, known as the Round Hill, which is scheduled ancient monument.

Just outside the village and to the north, is the site of a set of Roman practice marching camps at Cawthorne, excavated by universities in recent years. The camps are thought to be there as the village was on the route of a Roman Road between York and Dunsley Bay (Sandsend), on the Yorkshire Coast near to Whitby. These have been registered as ancient monuments. To the north of the village lies Cropton Forest, a  woodland that has a caravan park within it. The forest is also noted for a programme to reintroduce beavers, which was successful in producing kits (baby beavers) in 2021.

St Gregory's Church is a grade II listed structure, and whilst there is no accurate record of its building date, it was rebuilt in 1844. In the churchyard is the base of a medieval cross. There is a poem and tradition associated with taking a drink and leaving money at the cross.

Governance
An electoral ward in the same name exists. This ward stretches south to Normanby with a total population taken at the 2011 Census of 1,542.

Notable people
William Scoresby, Arctic whaler and navigator who sailed out of Whitby

References

External links

Map of the village

Villages in North Yorkshire
Civil parishes in North Yorkshire